Fabless manufacturing is the design and sale of hardware devices and semiconductor chips while outsourcing their fabrication (or fab) to a specialized manufacturer called a semiconductor foundry. These foundries are typically, but not exclusively, located in the United States, China, and Taiwan. Fabless companies can benefit from lower capital costs while concentrating their research and development resources on the end market. Some fabless companies and pure play foundries (like TSMC) may offer integrated-circuit design services to third parties.

History 
Prior to the 1980s, the semiconductor industry was vertically integrated.  Semiconductor companies owned and operated their own silicon-wafer fabrication facilities and developed their own process technology for manufacturing their chips.  These companies also carried out the assembly and testing of their own chips.

As with most technology-intensive industries, the silicon manufacturing process presents high barriers to entry into the market, especially for small start-up companies.  But integrated device manufacturers (IDMs) had excess production capacity. This presented an opportunity for smaller companies, relying on IDMs, to design but not manufacture silicon.

These conditions underlay the birth of the fabless business model.  Engineers at new companies began designing and selling ICs without owning a fabrication plant.  Simultaneously, the foundry industry was established by Dr. Morris Chang with the founding of Taiwan Semiconductor Manufacturing Corporation (TSMC).  Foundries became the cornerstone of the fabless model, providing a non-competitive manufacturing partner for fabless companies.

The co-founders of the first fabless semiconductor company, LSI Computer Systems, Inc. (LSI/CSI) LSI/CSI, worked together at General Instrument Microelectronics (GIM) in the 1960s. In 1969 GIM was hired to develop three full custom CPU circuits for Control Data Corporation (CDC). These CPU ICs operated at 5 MHz (state of the art at the time) and were incorporated in the CDC Computer 469. The Computer 469 became a standard CDC Aerospace Computer and was used in the Spy in the Sky Satellites in addition to other classified satellite programs.

GIM was reluctant to proceed with the next phase of the program, which it deemed to be too technically challenging. The GIM engineers who had worked on the project were encouraged by CDC to form their own company to provide five new custom circuits. This resulted in the formation of LSI Computer Systems, Inc. (LSI/CSI) in 1969. The new chips were power-efficient random logic circuits with extremely high circuit densities. These new circuits also operated at 5 MHz. These devices were designated LSI0101, LSI0102, LSI0103, LSI0104, and LSI0105 and were manufactured in compact 40-pin metal flat packs with  spacing.

In creating the fabless semiconductor industry, LSI/CSI had to do the following:
 Select a suitable and CDC certifiable wafer fab house.
 Monitor the process, and inspection of all wafers per Class S requirements and visuals.
 Perform all In-Process inspections of the wafers.
 Select a highly reliable packaging house capable of meeting CDC's Class S assembly requirements.
 Have CDC certify and approve the assembly facility and its processes.
 LSI/CSI successfully performed all required environmental testing at Class S approved facilities.
 LSI/CSI prepared and submitted all environmental test reports.

CDC's Aerospace Computer 469 weighed one pound, consumed a total of 10 watts and ran at 5 MHz. CDC ran a parallel program, developing a chipset of eight similar parts that were to operate at 2.5 MHz with the identical environmental and Class S requirements. CDC had initial difficulties with this project, but eventually awarded another contract to LSI/CSI to manage the processing, inspection, visuals, assembly, and testing of the ICs. These parts were given the designation LSI3201, LSI3202, LSI3203, LSI3204 and LSI3205. Another successful space program completed by LSI/CSI was the upgrade to class S of a Standard Brushless DC Motor Commutator/Controller Chip, LS7262, which was implemented in satellites.

In 1994, Jodi Shelton, along with a half a dozen CEOs of fabless companies, established the Fabless Semiconductor Association (FSA) to promote the fabless business-model globally. In December 2007, the FSA transitioned to the GSA, the Global Semiconductor Alliance. The organizational transition reflected the role FSA had played as a global organization that collaborated with other organizations to co-host international events.

Industry growth and success 
The fabless manufacturing model has been further validated by the conversion of major IDMs to a completely fabless model, including (for example) Conexant Systems, Semtech, and most recently, LSI Logic. Today most major IDMs including Apple Inc., Infineon and Cypress Semiconductor have adopted the practice of outsourcing chip manufacturing as a significant manufacturing strategy.

Sales leaders 
The top 5 sales leaders for fabless companies in 2020 were:

The top 5 sales leaders for fabless companies in 2019 were:

The top 5 sales leaders for fabless companies in 2017 were:

The top 5 sales leaders for fabless companies in 2013 were:

The top 5 sales leaders for fabless companies in 2011 were:

The top 5 sales leaders for fabless companies in 2010 were:

The top 5 sales leaders for fabless companies in 2003 were:

See also 

 ARM Holdings has an alternative fabless semiconductor design business model.
 Foundry model
 Moore's second law
 Semiconductor consolidation
 Semiconductor device fabrication
 Semiconductor equipment sales leaders by year
 Semiconductor foundry sales leaders by year
 Semiconductor intellectual property core (IP cores)

References 

 
Semiconductor device fabrication